UFWA may refer to:
 United Federal Workers of America
 United Farm Workers of America
 United Farm Women of Alberta